Littlerock is an unincorporated community in Thurston County, Washington, United States. The town is west of Interstate 5 and Maytown. 

Littlerock is located near several protected lands, such as the Mima Mounds Natural Area Preserve and Capitol State Forest.

History

The community was later renamed "Little Rock" or "Littlerock" for a mounting stone on the Rutledge property; a post office called Littlerock has been in operation since 1879.

In 2020, the Washington Commercial Aviation Coordinating Commission nominated a site north of Littlerock for the site of a new major airport to serve the Seattle metropolitan area alongside Seattle–Tacoma International Airport (Sea-Tac). A similar site was proposed in the 1990s for a study that ultimately resulted in an expansion of Sea-Tac. The Littlerock site was determined to be infeasible due to community opposition and its potential air corridor passing over Olympia.

Cedar Creek Corrections Center

Littlerock is also home to a Washington State Department Of Corrections prison facility, Cedar Creek Corrections Center (CCCC). The minimum security facility was built in 1954 with a capacity for 480 minimum-security male inmates, housing them in two areas, the Cascade and Olympic units. 

The prison has a program which allows some inmates to work with animals.  Inmates are taught how to train service dogs and are paired with a canine for several months while the animal undergoes training.  This program is provided through Brigadoon Service Dogs.  Offenders at Cedar Creek Corrections Center are also provided anger and stress management counseling, an intensive outpatient substance abuse program, moral recognition therapy, and cognitive behavioral treatment.  Inmates can work institutional jobs providing support services to the prison in custodial maintenance, laundry, and food preparation.  Technical training is available in siding, roofing, drywall installation, and building maintenance. Inmates are provided as service crews that supply labor for government agencies and non-profit organizations. Some of the work performed by inmates includes operating a wastewater treatment plant and maintenance at Washington Corrections Center.  Offenders also work maintaining trails, planting trees, and fighting forest fires for the Washington Department of Natural Resources.

Parks and recreation
The Mima Mounds Natural Area Preserve, declared a National Natural Landmark, is located outside of the town center. Other nearby protected areas include the Glacial Heritage Preserve and the Black River Habitat Management Area. The community lies near the border of the Capitol State Forest.

References

Unincorporated communities in Thurston County, Washington
Unincorporated communities in Washington (state)